Got Beef is a song from American hip hop ensemble Tha Eastsidaz, released on April 3, 2000 as the second single from studio album Tha Eastsidaz.

Track listing 

 "Got Beef" (with Jayo Felony & Sylk-E. Fyne) - 4:11 
 "Got Beef" (videoclipe) (with Jayo Felony) - 4:30

Music video 
The music video for the song was released on April 3, 2000 by music distributor The Orchard, and directed by Chris Robinson and produced by Rachel Curl.

Chart history

References 

2000 singles
Hip hop songs
2000 songs
TVT Records singles
Gangsta rap songs
Songs written by Snoop Dogg